Brandon Alexander Jordan (born September 17, 1988) is an American football player who is currently a free agent. He played college football at the University of Illinois at Urbana–Champaign and attended Merrillville High School in Merrillville, Indiana. He has also been a member of the Wichita Wild, Chicago Slaughter and BC Lions.

References

External links
BC Lions profile
Calgary Stampeders bio 
Illinois Fighting Illini bio
Fanbase profile

Living people
1988 births
Players of American football from Houston
Players of Canadian football from Houston
American football defensive linemen
Canadian football defensive linemen
American players of Canadian football
Illinois Fighting Illini football players
Wichita Wild players
Chicago Slaughter players
BC Lions players
Calgary Stampeders players
People from Merrillville, Indiana